Irving Garcia (born February 4, 1988 in Yuma, Arizona) is an American soccer player who currently plays for FC Arizona.

Career

College and amateur
Garcia attended San Luis High School and played college soccer at Yavapai College from 2006 to 2007 before transferring to UC Irvine in 2008. At UC Irvine he appeared in 23 games, scoring 7 goals and adding 9 assists, and was a member of UC Irvine's 2008 and 2009 Big West championship teams, helping them to back to back Big West Championship titles, including two trips to the NCAA College Cup.

During his college years Garcia also played for Orange County Blue Star in the USL Premier Development League.

Professional
Garcia was drafted in the fourth round (50th overall) of the 2010 MLS SuperDraft by New York Red Bulls.

He made his professional debut on April 27, 2010 in a U.S. Open Cup game against Philadelphia Union. On May 26, 2010 he made his first official start for New York in a 3–0 U.S. Open Cup victory over Colorado Rapids. During the match, he assisted on New York's first goal and played 68 minutes.

Garcia was waived by New York on March 1, 2011. Later in 2011 he signed with Guatemalan side Antigua GFC.

In March 2012, Garcia signed with Los Angeles Blues of the USL Pro.

References

External links

1988 births
Living people
American soccer players
American expatriate soccer players
Yavapai Roughriders men's soccer players
UC Irvine Anteaters men's soccer players
Orange County Blue Star players
New York Red Bulls players
Orange County SC players
Portland Timbers 2 players
People from Yuma, Arizona
Soccer players from Arizona
USL League Two players
USL Championship players
New York Red Bulls draft picks
Antigua GFC players
Association football midfielders
Expatriate footballers in Guatemala
American expatriate sportspeople in Guatemala
FC Arizona players
National Premier Soccer League players